Botswana competed at the 2014 Summer Youth Olympics, in Nanjing, China from 16 August to 28 August 2014.

Medalists

Athletics

Botswana qualified five athletes.

Qualification Legend: Q=Final A (medal); qB=Final B (non-medal); qC=Final C (non-medal); qD=Final D (non-medal); qE=Final E (non-medal)

Boys
Track & road events

Girls
Track & road events

Badminton

Botswana was given a quota to compete by the tripartite committee.

Singles

Doubles

Judo

Botswana was given a quota to compete by the tripartite committee.

Individual

Team

Swimming

Botswana qualified one swimmer.

Girls

References

2014 in Botswana sport
Nations at the 2014 Summer Youth Olympics
Botswana at the Youth Olympics